Csehbánya (Böhmischhütten, Böhmisch-Hütten, "Cseh-Bánya means "Czech mine"") is a village in Veszprém county, Hungary.

Nearby municipalities 
 Németbánya
 Farkasgyepű
 Döbrönte
 Herend

External links 
 Street map (Hungarian)

Populated places in Veszprém County
Hungarian German communities